Giorgio Tumbarello (born 20 April 1996) is an Italian professional footballer who plays as a midfielder for  club Lucchese.

Club career
In 2018 he joined Serie C club Cavese. Tumbarello made his professional debut on 16 September 2019 against Casertana.

On 16 July 2019, he signed with Vibonese on Serie C. He played two and a half seasons for the club.

On 31 January 2022, he moved to Lucchese.

References

External links
 
 

1996 births
Living people
People from Marsala
Footballers from Sicily
Italian footballers
Association football midfielders
Serie C players
Serie D players
Eccellenza players
Trapani Calcio players
S.S.D. Marsala Calcio players
A.S.D. Licata 1931 players
Cavese 1919 players
U.S. Vibonese Calcio players
Lucchese 1905 players
Sportspeople from the Province of Trapani